Kilkim Žaibu (from Lithuanian "arise/soar with the lightning") is an extreme metal festival in Lithuania, held annually since 1999. The festival distinguishes itself from other major metal festivals by incorporating the shows of metal aesthetic-related performers such as medieval folk bands and historical reconstruction clubs, as well as a blacksmith and artisan market.

Before that, it had been happening at "Plūgo broliai" in Joniškis, Lithuania.

Between 2000 to 3000 people visit the festival annually from various countries. Bands have performed at Kilkim Žaibu festivals from Australia, Norway, Hungary, Czech Republic, Romania, Ukraine, Russia, Sweden, Finland, Germany and neighbouring countries.

Kilkim Žaibu 19 
The festival took place in Varniai, Lithuania on 28 - 30 June 2018.

Kilkim Žaibu 18 
The festival took place in Varniai, Lithuania on 29 June - 1 July 2017.

Kilkim Žaibu 17 
The festival took place in Varniai, Lithuania on 23–25 June 2016.

Kilkim Žaibu 16 
The festival took place in Žagarė, Lithuania on 26–27 June 2015.

Kilkim Žaibu 15 
The festival took place in Varniai, Lithuania on 20–22 June 2014.

Kilkim Žaibu 14 
The festival took place in Varniai, Lithuania on 21–23 June 2013. The line-up:

  Baltic Snakes
  Sūduvos tauras
  Jotvos sūnūs
  Pera Sudinoi
  Leitgiris
  Heiligenberg

Kilkim Žaibu 13
The festival took place in Varniai, Lithuania on 22–24 June 2012. Line-up:

  Pajauta
  Stebulė
  Kovarnis
  Jotva
  Ugunszīme
  Varingis
  Sūduvos Tauras

Kilkim Žaibu 12

The festival took place in Varniai, Lithuania on 23–25 June 2011. The line-up:

  Vaiguva
  Pajauta
  Stebule
  Dvargantis

Kilkim Žaibu 11
The festival in 2010 year first time took place at lake Lukstas in Varniai, Lithuania on 11–12 June 2010. The lineup:

  Kovarnis – Lietuvos karių klubas

Kilkim Žaibu 10 

The festival took place at "Plūgo Broliai", Joniškis, Lithuania on 12–13 June 2009. The line-up:

Kilkim Žaibu 9 
The festival took place at "Plūgo Broliai", Joniškis, Lithuania on 7 June 2008. The line-up:

Pre-2008 history 

The bands that have performed at this festival since 1999 include:

  Sear Bliss
  Nokturnal Mortum
  
  Moonsorrow
  Bestia
  Flaying
  Preternatural
  
  
  Miseria
  
  Ugnėlakis
  Liūnuosna
  
  Profane Probity
  Donis
  Notanga
  Sinimaniseele
  Vilkači
  Meinardus
  Andaja
  Ossastorium
  Ugly Ogre
  Baltuva
  Thundertale
  
  
  Dark Domination

References

External links

Official website 
Facebook page
YouTube page
Instagram page
BBC Documentary about Kilkim Žaibu 18
Light a pagan fire at Kilkim Žaibu 2017: Thursday Review

Music festivals in Lithuania
Heavy metal festivals in Lithuania
1999 establishments in Lithuania
Recurring events established in 1999
Annual events in Lithuania
Telšiai County
Folk festivals in Lithuania
Rock festivals in Lithuania
Summer events in Lithuania
Modern pagan music festivals
Modern paganism in Lithuania